Jonathan Pitkin (born 1978) is a contemporary classical composer.

He was born in Dublin but brought up in Edinburgh. He studied at Christ Church, Oxford and at the Royal Academy of Music under Christopher Brown, where he was the recipient of several prizes and awards. His music has been performed and commissioned internationally as well as at major venues across the UK, including the Royal Festival Hall and the Huddersfield and Spitalfields Festivals. Performers have included the BBC Scottish Symphony Orchestra, the BBC Singers, members of the Philharmonia Orchestra, and conductors Garry Walker, Nicholas Cleobury, Stephen Layton and Martyn Brabbins.

In 1998 he attended Karlheinz Stockhausen's inaugural composition course in Kürten, Germany, and in 2000 spent three months at the Paris Conservatoire, where he studied with Guy Reibel as well as following courses in orchestration and electro-acoustic composition. He has also participated in classes and seminars with composers including Sir Harrison Birtwistle, Poul Ruders and Michael Finnissy.

In 2002 Pitkin worked as an assistant composer on the RPS Award-winning Sound Inventors initiative, and in 2003 he wrote for St Albans High School as part of the spnm/Making Music scheme Adopt a Composer, in connection with which he appeared on BBC Radio 3’s Music Matters. He now teaches composition and musicianship at the Royal College of Music Junior Department.

In 2001 he was awarded the Temple Church Composition Prize for his anthem Hark! a herald voice is calling and was shortlisted by the Society for the Promotion of New Music. Three of his most recent works were broadcast on BBC Radio 3 in 2004, including the orchestral piece Borrowed Time. Two of his choral pieces were published by Oxford University Press in the New Horizons series.

Pitkin is currently working towards a DMus in composition at the Royal College of Music, with support from the Arts and Humanities Research Council.

References

External links
 Jonathan Pitkin's website

Living people
1978 births
Alumni of the Royal Academy of Music
Alumni of the Royal College of Music
Alumni of Christ Church, Oxford
21st-century classical composers
Male classical composers
21st-century male musicians